Rinkel is a surname. Notable people with the surname include:

Elfriede Rinkel (1922–2018), German SS guard at the Ravensbrück concentration camp
Ivo Rinkel (1920–2000), Dutch tennis and field hockey player
John Rinkel (1905–1975), English sprinter

See also
Rinke